Treasure Quest may refer to:

Treasure Quest (game), 1996 computer puzzle game
Treasure Quest: Snake Island, American reality television series
Treasure Quest (TV series), treasure hunting documentary on the Discovery Channel